André Leduc (October 25, 1919 – January 31, 2001) was a politician was Quebec, Canada.  He was a Member of the Legislative Assembly of Quebec/National Assembly of Quebec (MNA).

Background

He was born on October 25, 1919, in Grand-Mère, Mauricie and worked in grocery.

Political career

Leduc ran as a Union Nationale candidate in the district of Laviolette in the 1966 election, and won.  He succeeded eight-term Union Nationale incumbent Romulus Ducharme.

He did not run for re-election in the 1970 election.

Death

Leduc died on January 31, 2001, in Grand-Mère.

References

1919 births
2001 deaths
People from Shawinigan
Union Nationale (Quebec) MNAs